To take something with a "grain of salt" or "pinch of salt" is an English idiom that suggests to view something, specifically claims that may be misleading or unverified, with skepticism or to not interpret something literally.  

In the old-fashioned English units of weight, a grain weighs approximately 65 mg, which is about how much table salt a person might pick up between the fingers as a pinch.

History 
Hypotheses of the phrase's origin include Pliny the Elder's Naturalis Historia, regarding the discovery of a recipe for an antidote to a poison. In the antidote, one of the ingredients was a grain of salt. Threats involving the poison were thus to be taken "with a grain of salt", and therefore less seriously.

The phrase  ("with a grain of salt") is not what Pliny wrote. It is constructed according to the grammar of modern European languages rather than Classical Latin.

An alternative account says that the Roman general Pompey believed that he could make himself immune to poison by ingesting small amounts of various poisons, and he took this treatment with a grain of salt to help him swallow the poison.  In this version, the salt is not the antidote. It was taken merely to assist in swallowing the poison.

The Latin word  ( is the genitive) means both "salt" and "wit", thus the Latin phrase  could be translated to either "with a grain of salt" or "with a grain of wit", actually to "with caution"/cautiously.

The phrase is typically said "with a pinch of salt" in British English and said "with a grain of salt" in American English.

References

External links

Edible salt
English-language idioms
English phrases